Grevillea chrysophaea, commonly known as golden grevillea, is a species of flowering plant in the family Proteaceae and is endemic to Victoria in Australia. It is a spreading shrub with oblong to almost linear leaves, and dull to golden yellow flowers with a red or orange-red style.

Description
The upper surface of the leaves is glabrous or softly-hairy and the lower surface is woolly to velvety hairy.

Taxonomy
Grevillea chrysophaea was first formally described in 1854 by Carl Meissner in the journal Linnaea: ein Journal für die Botanik in ihrem ganzen Umfange, oder Beiträge zur Pflanzenkunde from an unpublished description by Ferdinand von Mueller.

Distribution and habitat
Golden grevillea usually grows in eucalypt or banksia woodland in the Brisbane Ranges and in Gippsland in southern Victoria. It is listed as "rare in Victoria" on the Department of Sustainability and Environment's 2014 Advisory List of Rare Or Threatened Plants In Victoria.

References

chrysophaea
Flora of Victoria (Australia)
Proteales of Australia
Garden plants of Australia
Taxa named by Carl Meissner
Plants described in 1854